Dr James Muttlebury FRSE (1775–1832) was a Scottish physician who practised in Jamaica and England. He was a noted amateur botanist.

Life

He was born in 1775, either in Scotland or in Northern Ireland. He studied Medicine at St Andrews University.

In 1804 he was working as a military physician in Athlone in Ireland, and was transferred to Marlborough.

In 1814 he was living in Jamaica and practising there.

In 1819 he was elected a Fellow of the Royal Society of Edinburgh. His proposers were fellow-botanists Robert Jameson, William Wright, and Hugh Murray.

In 1822 he moved to Bath as a GP. In 1826 he became a Physician at the United Hospital in Bath. In 1824 he was living at the Edgar Buildings in Bath.

Family

He married Margaret Jane Rutherford of Kingston, Jamaica (1788–1869). She died in Canada.

They had eleven children including Captain James William Muttlebury of Bath who was father to Stanley Muttlebury.

References

1775 births
1832 deaths
Alumni of the University of St Andrews
Scottish botanists
Fellows of the Royal Society of Edinburgh